The Seventeenth Amendment may refer to the:

Seventeenth Amendment of the Constitution of Ireland, relating to cabinet confidentiality
Seventeenth Amendment to the Constitution of Pakistan, granting more power to the President of Pakistan
Seventeenth Amendment of the Constitution of South Africa, restructuring the judicial system
Seventeenth Amendment to the United States Constitution, providing for the direct election of Senators